While Marxism had a significant impact on socialist thought, pre-Marxist thinkers (before Marx wrote on the subject) have advocated socialism in forms both similar and in stark contrast to Karl Marx and Friedrich Engels' conception of socialism, advocating some form of collective ownership over large-scale production, worker-management within the workplace, or in some cases a form of planned economy.

List
Early socialist and proto-socialist philosophers and political theorists:
 Gaius and Tiberius Gracchus ancient Roman statesmen who advocated heavily for policies in the interest of the Plebeians. These policies included land and wealth redistribution and subsidized grain to help the poor. 
 Gerrard Winstanley, who founded the Diggers movement in the United Kingdom
 François-Noël Babeuf, French revolutionary and journalist
 Charles Fourier, French philosopher who propounded principles very similar to that of Marx
 Louis Blanqui, French socialist and writer
 Marcus Thrane, Norwegian socialist
 Jean-Jacques Rousseau, Genevan philosopher, writer and composer whose works influenced the French Revolution
 Pierre-Joseph Proudhon, French politician and philosopher
 Pierre Leroux, French religious socialist

Ricardian socialist economists:
 Thomas Hodgskin, English Ricardian socialist and free-market anarchist
 Charles Hall
 John Francis Bray
 John Gray
 William Thompson
 Percy Ravenstone
 James Mill
 John Stuart Mill, classical political economist who came to advocate worker-cooperative socialism

Utopian socialist thinkers:
 Sylvain Maréchal
 Claude Henri de Saint-Simon
 Wilhelm Weitling
 Robert Owen
 Étienne Cabet
 Frances Wright

See also 
 Classical economics
 History of communism
 History of socialism
 Pre-Marxist communism
 Ricardian socialism
 Socialism
 Structural fix
 Utopian socialism
 Voluntaryism
 Yellow socialism

References 

Socialism